Meldahl House is a historic home located near Washington, Wood County, West Virginia. The house was built in the 1920s, and is a -story, three bay by three bay, frame American Foursquare style residence.  It has a hipped roof and a central stone chimney.  Also on the property is a wine cellar constructed about 1860 and a wooden gazebo.  The property is associated with the once-flourishing wine and grape industry of Wood County.

It was listed on the National Register of Historic Places in 1991.

References

Houses on the National Register of Historic Places in West Virginia
Houses in Wood County, West Virginia
National Register of Historic Places in Wood County, West Virginia
American Foursquare architecture in West Virginia
West Virginia wine
1920s establishments in West Virginia
Houses completed in the 20th century